is a natural hot spring located near Beppu, Japan. The waters of this hot spring are channels to several bathing resorts and is one of the most popular tourist destinations in its locale.

References 

Hot springs of Japan
Landforms of Ōita Prefecture
Tourist attractions in Ōita Prefecture